A pizzetta (plural: pizzette) is a small pizza that can range in size from a finger food at around  in diameter to that of a small personal-sized pizza.

Preparation
Pizzetta is typically prepared in the fashion of larger-sized pizza, using a dough, sauce, cheese and various toppings. It is sometimes prepared without a sauce. Pizzetta can be prepared using flatbread as a bread base, but puff pastry is also used. Additional herbs and greens can be added after pizzetta has been cooked.

Service
Pizzetta can be served as an hors d'oeuvre, a snack food and as a light meal. It may be served accompanied with wine to complement the dish.

See also

 List of hors d'oeuvre
 List of Italian dishes
 List of pizza varieties by country

References

External links
 
 

Appetizers
Pizza styles